Benjamim João Romano (born 19 August 1969 in Luanda) is a former Angolan basketball player. Romano played with the Angola national basketball team at the 1992 and 1996 Summer Olympics. In the 1992 Olympics, he appeared in one game and did not score a point. In the 1996 games, Romano played six games, scoring 14 points. On the club level, he played for Petro Atlético.

References

External links
 
 EMU Stats Profile
 Sports-Reference Profile

1969 births
Living people
Angolan men's basketball players
Angolan expatriate basketball people in the United States
Atlético Petróleos de Luanda basketball players
Eastern Michigan Eagles men's basketball players
Olympic basketball players of Angola
Basketball players at the 1992 Summer Olympics
Basketball players at the 1996 Summer Olympics
Basketball players from Luanda
Point guards
1994 FIBA World Championship players